Here We Go is the debut studio album by German-based boy group US5. It was released by Triple M Music, Global Music, and Universal Music on 18 November 2005 in German-speaking Europe. The album was in three formats: normal, limited edition (both released in November 2005) and new edition released in March 2006. The album was certified 3× gold for sales of over 300,000 copies.

Track listing
All tracks produced by Mike Michaels, Sammy Naja, and Mark Dollar.

Charts

Sales and certifications

References

2005 debut albums
US5 albums